Görkem Sevindik (born 17 October 1986) is a Turkish actor.

Sevindik was born on 17 October 1986 in Adana. He studied acting at Müjdat Gezen Art Center.

He made his television debut in 2010 by portraying the character of Pusat in hit crime seriesKurtlar Vadisi Pusu. After briefly appearing in Kalbim Seni Seçti, another breakthrough in his career came through a role in the popular military series Söz. In 2020, he joined the cast of crime series Ramo, acting alongside Murat Yıldırım and Esra Bilgiç.

Filmography

Awards 

 2014 Magazine Journalists Association, Promising Actor
 2018 Turkey Youth Awards, Best Supporting Actor
 2018 Ayaklıgazete Awards, Best Supporting Actor
 2018 Media and Art Awards, Best Supporting Actor
 2019 Istanbul Aydın University Awards, Best Supporting Actor

References

External links 
 
 

1986 births
Living people
Turkish male television actors
People from Adana